Amos was an unincorporated community in Humboldt County, in the U.S. state of Nevada.

History
A post office called Amos was in operation between 1889 and 1926.  According to the Federal Writers' Project, the first permanent settlement at Amos was made in 1910.

References

Unincorporated communities in Humboldt County, Nevada
Unincorporated communities in Nevada